El Macano is a corregimiento in Guararé District, Los Santos Province, Panama with a population of 281 as of 2010. Its population as of 1990 was 339; its population as of 2000 was 242.

References

Corregimientos of Los Santos Province